This is a list of birds that have been observed in the Madrean Sky Islands, which are enclaves of Madrean pine-oak woodlands, found at higher elevations in a complex of small mountain ranges in southern and southeastern Arizona, southwestern New Mexico, and northwestern Mexico.  The Sky Islands are surrounded at lower elevations by the Sonoran and Chihuahuan deserts.

Varied bunting
Bushtit
Mexican chickadee
Cordilleran flycatcher
American dusky flycatcher
American grey flycatcher
Hammond's flycatcher
Nutting's flycatcher
Sulphur-bellied flycatcher
Black-tailed gnatcatcher
Lawrence's goldfinch
Black-headed grosbeak
Anna's hummingbird
Berylline hummingbird
Black-chinned hummingbird
Blue-throated hummingbird
Broad-billed hummingbird
Broad-tailed hummingbird
Lucifer hummingbird
Magnificent hummingbird
Violet-crowned hummingbird
White-eared hummingbird
Mexican jay
Cassin's kingbird
Thick-billed kingbird
Chestnut-collared longspur
Thick-billed longspur
Buff-collared nightjar
Pygmy nuthatch
Elf owl
Flammulated owl
Spotted owl
Whiskered screech-owl
Thick-billed parrot
Pyrrhuloxia
Gambel's quail
Montezuma quail
Eared quetzal
Chihuahuan raven
Painted redstart
Baird's sparrow
Five-striped sparrow
Plain-capped starthroat
Bendire's thrasher
Bridled titmouse
Juniper titmouse
Elegant trogon
Hutton's vireo
Plumbeous vireo
Grace's warbler
Olive warbler
Red-faced warbler
Acorn woodpecker
Arizona woodpecker
Gila woodpecker
Brown-throated wren

-
Madrean Sky Islands